The Antranik Youth Association (AYA), or simply Antranik, is a basketball team based in Antelias, Lebanon. It is part of the Antranik Youth Association.

Founded in 1987, Antranik's basketball men and women teams have been part of the Lebanese Basketball League for many years. The women's team has won the Lebanese championship 10 times in a row, between 2002 and 2012, and the Arab Women's Club Basketball Championship multiple times.

The home games for both men and women are held in the club's own sports center, the AGBU Demirdjian Center, on Autostrade Dbayé, in Antelias, Lebanon.

Honours 
 Arab Women's Club Basketball Championship
 Winners (2): 2006, 2007

 Lebanese Women's Basketball League
 Winners (10): 2002, 2003, 2004, 2005, 2006, 2007, 2008, 2009, 2010

References

External links
 

Antranik Youth Association
1987 establishments in Lebanon
Basketball teams established in 1987
Basketball teams in Lebanon
Diaspora sports clubs
Sport in Beirut